Ole & Axel (American) or Long & Short (British) were a pair of comics from Denmark, known in Danish as Fyrtårnet og Bivognen (Lighthouse and Sidecar), often called Fy og Bi for short. The pair were played by Carl Schenstrøm (1881–1942) and Harald Madsen (1890–1949).

The duo debuted in 1921 with the film Film, Flirt og Forlovelse (Film, Flirt, and Fiancées), and they appeared until 1940 in about 50 comedies, mostly silent films. Of these, 13 were made outside Denmark (in Sweden, Germany, Austria, and England). Their heyday was in the 1920s, when Ole & Axel were Danish cinematography's major export product and the world's first internationally renowned film comedy pair.

Ole & Axel were known as Telegrafstolpen og Tilhengeren in Norway, Fyrtornet och Släpvagnen in Sweden, Majakka ja Perävaunu in Finland, Doublepatte et Patachon in France, Watt en Halfwatt in the Netherlands,  and Long & Short in England. Relatively few of their films were screened in the United States. In other countries the duo was known by their German name, Pat und Patachon.

References

External links
 Telegrafstolpen og Tilhengeren at the Danish Film Institute (Carl Schenstrøm)
 Telegrafstolpen og Tilhengeren at the Danish Film Institute (Harald Madsen)
 Harald Madsen and Carl Schenstrøm at Film Reference

Danish comedy duos
Danish male comedians
Male characters in film
Comedy film characters
Film characters introduced in 1921
Fictional Danish people